Abdullah Laghmani (1960s –2 September 2009) was Deputy Chief of the National Directorate of Security (NDS) in Afghanistan, and a prominent ally of President Hamid Karzai. He first served as an intelligence officer for the Northern Alliance during Taliban rule. After the formation of Karzai administration in late 2001, Laghmani served as the intelligence chief of Kandahar province before moving up as deputy chief. Laghmani was killed in a Taliban suicide bomb attack in Mehtar Lam, Laghman Province.

An ethnic Pashtun, he was particularly knowledgeable about the Taliban and the movement's mentors in Pakistan. He and his agents helped determine a possible link between the bombers who attacked the Indian Embassy in Kabul in July 2008 and the Pakistani intelligence service (ISI) in Peshawar.

References

External links
Abdullah Laghmani dead

1960s births
2009 deaths
Afghan terrorism victims
Pashtun people
Terrorism deaths in Afghanistan
Deaths by improvised explosive device in Afghanistan
Year of birth unknown
Date of birth unknown